The 2022 India Open (officially known as the Yonex-Sunrise India Open 2022 for sponsorship reasons) was a badminton tournament that took place at the K. D. Jadhav Indoor Hall in New Delhi, India, from 11 to 16 January 2022. It had a total prize pool of US$400,000.

Tournament
The 2022 India Open was the first tournament of the 2022 BWF World Tour and was part of the India Open championships, which had been held since 1973. The tournament was organized by the Badminton Association of India with sanction from the Badminton World Federation.

Venue
This international tournament was held at the K. D. Jadhav Indoor Hall in New Delhi, India.

Point distribution 
Below is the point distribution table for each phase of the tournament based on the BWF points system for the BWF World Tour Super 500 event.

Prize money 
The total prize money for this tournament was US$400,000. The distribution of the prize money was in accordance by BWF regulations.

Impact of COVID-19 on the tournament 
Due to COVID-19, the tournament was held behind closed doors at K. D. Jadhav Indoor Hall with the participating players tested for COVID-19 daily.

However, there were many shuttlers withdrawing from the tournament before and during the tournament. On 7 January 2022, the entire England contingent withdrew before the competition started after Sean Vendy and Nathan Robertson was tested positive with COVID-19. On 12 January 2022, seven Indian shuttlers, including Srikanth Kidambi was withdrawn for the same reason. Rodion Alimov and Alina Davletova had to withdraw as well after Alimov was tested positive, giving Terry Hee and Tan Wei Han a walkover on their mixed doubles semi-finals.

Men's singles

Seeds 

 Srikanth Kidambi (second round)
 B. Sai Praneeth (withdrew) 
 Lakshya Sen (champion)
 Kantaphon Wangcharoen (withdrew)
 Loh Kean Yew (final)
 Sameer Verma (second round)
 Tommy Sugiarto (first round)
 Prannoy Kumar (quarter-finals)

Finals

Top half

Section 1

Section 2

Bottom half

Section 3

Section 4

Women's singles

Seeds 

 P. V. Sindhu (semi-finals)
 Busanan Ongbamrungphan (champion)
 Yeo Jia Min (quarter-finals)
 Saina Nehwal (second round)
 Evgeniya Kosetskaya (first round)
 Supanida Katethong (final)
 Iris Wang (withdrew)
 Fitriani (withdrew)

Finals

Top half

Section 1

Section 2

Bottom half

Section 3

Section 4

Men's doubles

Seeds 

 Mohammad Ahsan / Hendra Setiawan (final)
 Satwiksairaj Rankireddy / Chirag Shetty (champions)
 Ong Yew Sin / Teo Ee Yi (semi-finals)
 Ben Lane / Sean Vendy (withdrew)
 B. Sumeeth Reddy / Manu Attri (withdrew)
 Arjun MR / Dhruv Kapila (second round)
 Krishna Prasad Garaga / Vishnuvardhan Goud Panjala (first round)
 Fabien Delrue / William Villeger (semi-finals)

Finals

Top half

Section 1

Section 2

Bottom half

Section 3

Section 4

Women's doubles

Seeds 

 Jongkolphan Kititharakul / Rawinda Prajongjai (withdrew)
 Ashwini Ponnappa / N. Sikki Reddy (second round)
 Anastasiia Akchurina / Olga Morozova (final)
 Benyapa Aimsaard / Nuntakarn Aimsaard (champions)
 Vivian Hoo / Lim Chiew Sien (quarter-finals)
 Margot Lambert / Anne Tran (withdrew)
 Gayathri Gopichand / Treesa Jolly  (second round)
 Shikha Gautam / K. Ashwini Bhat (quarter-finals)

Finals

Top half

Section 1

Section 2

Bottom half

Section 3

Section 4

Mixed doubles

Seeds 

 Tan Kian Meng / Lai Pei Jing (semi-finals)
 Rodion Alimov / Alina Davletova (semi-finals)
 Chen Tang Jie / Peck Yen Wei (final)
 Callum Hemming / Jessica Pugh (withdrew) 
 Chan Peng Soon / Valeree Siow (quarter-finals)
 Adham Hatem Elgamal / Doha Hany (second round)
 Dhruv Kapila / Nelakurihi Sikki Reddy (second round)
 Venkat Gaurav Prasad / Juhi Dewangan (quarter-finals)

Finals

Top half

Section 1

Section 2

Bottom half

Section 3

Section 4

References

External links
 Tournament Link

India Open (badminton)
India Open
India Open
India Open